The Diseased and the Poisoned is the second studio album by American deathcore band Carnifex. It was made in 2008 and was released on June 24 of the same year. The song "Adornment of the Sickened" was released as Carnifex's first single. This is the first album with Ryan Gudmunds on guitar.

Track listing

Personnel 
Carnifex
Scott Lewis – vocals
Shawn Cameron – drums, keyboards
Cory Arford – rhythm guitar
Ryan Gudmunds – lead guitar
Fred Calderon – bass

Production
Produced by Chris "Zeuss" Harris and Carnifex
Tracked, engineered and mixed by Chris "Zeuss" Harris
Mastered by Alan Douches at West West Side Music
Layout by Mike Milford and DoubleJ

References 

2008 albums
Carnifex (band) albums
Victory Records albums
Albums produced by Chris "Zeuss" Harris